Emidio "Mimi" Soltysik (October 30, 1974 – June 28, 2020) was an American socialist political activist for the Socialist Party USA. He was the party's nominee for President of the United States in the 2016 election alongside Angela Nicole Walker, who was the party's vice-presidential nominee.

From October 2013 to October 2015, Soltysik served as national co-chair of the Socialist Party USA. Prior to that, he served as national vice chair from 2011 to 2013. Soltysik also served as state chair of the Socialist Party of California from its chartering in 2011 to 2017.

Personal life
Emidio Soltysik was born in Reading, Pennsylvania. After high school, Soltysik became a professional musician until his mid-thirties. Speaking of that period, he said in an interview: "I was incredibly self destructive, self absorbed, and almost entirely focused on instant gratification. By the time I reached my early 30s, I felt as if I had bottomed out. Substance abuse had taken a heavy toll on my health, both physically and mentally, and I found myself in a position where I was essentially starting from scratch." 

Soltysik then returned to higher education and graduated from Troy University and then went on to earn an MPA degree at California State University, Northridge. He later said "I came to the conclusion that, if the first half of my life was spent tearing humanity down, the second half of my life would be dedicated to making a substantive difference." On June 28, 2020, Soltysik died after a prolonged struggle with liver cancer.

Political career
Soltysik was elected as the male co-chair of the Socialist Party USA for the 2013–2015 term at the party's 2013 national convention. He was also the chair of the Socialist Party of California.

In 2014, Soltysik was one of eight candidates in the primary for California's 62nd State Assembly district. Under California's nonpartisan blanket primary system, the top two candidates from the primary, regardless of party, advance to the general election. Soltysik finished in 7th place with 2.5% of the vote.

In October 2015, Soltysik filed a Federal lawsuit against the California Secretary of State because he had been required to list "Party Preference: None" on the 2014 primary ballot; the California election law allows candidates to list only a party preference of a qualified party or "None" on the ballot, and the Socialist Party was not a qualified party in California.

2016 presidential campaign
 
On October 17, 2015, the Socialist Party USA's national convention nominated Soltysik for president and Angela Nicole Walker for vice president. The party did not have automatic ballot access in any state.

Soltysik has been interviewed about socialist issues by web sites including MTV Hive and Bloomberg Politics.

Soltysik has been interviewed regarding his presidential bid in a number of outlets, including the Independent Voter Network, The North Star and the Hampton Institute.

In April 2016, Soltysik was interviewed on CNBC regarding growing support for socialism in the United States.

The Soltysik/Walker ticket received 2,704 total votes including write-ins. He also won 4.2% of the vote in concurrent Guam's presidential straw poll. However, Guam has no representation in the Electoral College as it is a territory and not a state.

References

External links
2016 campaign web site

1974 births
2020 deaths
21st-century American politicians
California State University, Northridge alumni
Candidates in the 2016 United States presidential election
Deaths from cancer in California
Deaths from liver cancer
Politicians from Los Angeles
Politicians from Reading, Pennsylvania
Socialist Party USA politicians from California
Socialist Party USA presidential nominees
Troy University alumni